Dark Days is the third studio album by the American nu metal band Coal Chamber. It was released on May 7, 2002.

Background and content
Bassist Rayna Foss-Rose left the band after this album was recorded; she was replaced by Nadja Peulen, who had already previously replaced her for Coal Chamber's tours in 1999 during Rayna's pregnancy. This was the last studio album from Coal Chamber before they disbanded due to personal differences.

Dark Days is often regarded as the band's most aggressive and heaviest album; while past Coal Chamber albums had softer songs scattered throughout them, Dark Days stays mostly aggressive all the way through. Dark Days mostly combines the styles from the band's debut album with their second album Chamber Music, mixing the nu metal elements with the gothic metal elements from Chamber Music. Dark Days received mixed reviews from music critics but was more popular with fans.

On their last show, guitarist Meegs Rascón accidentally hit vocalist Dez Fafara on the head with his guitar, with Dez walking off stage only to reappear claiming that this was to be Coal Chamber's last show. Dez then released Giving the Devil His Due which was a collection of unreleased tracks, remixes, and demos by Coal Chamber. Afterward, he went on to start the band DevilDriver.

"Fiend" would be the album's only single. Its music video found airplay on Uranium, which also featured an interview with the band and the song "Glow" was also most notably featured on the soundtrack of The Scorpion King.

The song "Something Told Me" was featured on the Resident Evil end credits as the second song.

Track listing
All songs written by Mike Cox/B. Dez Fafara/Rayna Foss/Miguel Rascón except where noted.

Charts

References

External links
 

2002 albums
Coal Chamber albums
Roadrunner Records albums